is Tackey & Tsubasa's eighth single under the Avex Trax label and is their first single for 2007.

Overview
"Dame/Crazy Rainbow" is Tackey & Tsubasa's eighth single and their first single for 2007. The first a-side song, "Dame", is being used as the commercial theme song for the music service sites "Joy Sound", "dwango.jp", and "nusic.jp". The second a-side song, "Crazy Rainbow", was used as the eighth opening theme song for the anime One Piece.

As with their other singles, "Dame/Crazy Rainbow" was released in three different versions, each version coming with a different cover, along with different limited bonus material. Version A of the CD included a limited edition DVD with music clips of "Dame" and "Crazy Rainbow", and choreography lessons for the song "Dame". The B Version of the single included a limited DVD with the eighth opening theme song of "One Piece", a twelve-page photo booklet, and a "One Piece" sticker.

Track listing

CD+DVD Format - Jacket A

CD Portion
 ""
 "Crazy Rainbow"
 "" (Hideaki Takizawa solo)
 "Edge" (Imai Tsubasa solo)
 "×～ダメ～ karaoke"

DVD Portion
 "×～ダメ～ & Crazy Rainbow Music Clip Special Edition"
 "×～ダメ～ Choreography Lesson"
 "×～ダメ～ Choreography Lesson (Tackey Angle)"
 "×～ダメ～ Choreography Lesson (Tsubasa Angle)"

One Piece Collaboration CD+DVD Format - Jacket B

CD Portion
 "Crazy Rainbow"
 ""
 "" (Hideaki Takizawa solo)
 "Edge" (Imai Tsubasa solo)
 "Crazy Rainbow: karaoke"

DVD Portion
 "Crazy Rainbow: One Piece X Tackey & Tsubasa Original Animation Music Clip"
 "Crazy Rainbow: One Piece No Subtitles Opening

Regular CD Format - Jacket C
 ""
 "Crazy Rainbow"
 "" (Hideaki Takizawa solo)
 "Edge" (Imai Tsubasa solo)
 "×～ダメ～ (Tackey Part Version)"
 "×～ダメ～ (Tsubasa Part Version)"
 "Crazy Rainbow (Tackey Part Version)"
 "Crazy Rainbow (Tsubasa Part Version)"

Personnel
 Takizawa Hideaki - vocals
 Imai Tsubasa - vocals

Charts
Oricon Sales Chart (Japan)

References 

2007 singles
Tackey & Tsubasa songs
Oricon Weekly number-one singles